Megacephala bocandei is a species of tiger beetle in the subfamily Cicindelinae that was described by Félix Édouard Guérin-Méneville in 1848.

References

bocandei
Beetles described in 1848